St. Bernard's High School, Bulawayo is a Catholic school located in Pumula, a high density suburb of Bulawayo, Zimbabwe. One of its founding teachers and principals, Sister Ignatius Julie of the Sisters of Notre Dame de Namur, died in 1995. She was the school principal at the time of her death. St. Bernard's High School started running A-Level courses in 2004. The school relies on its Christian foundation to balance the academic and religious growth of its students. Its motto is "Prayer and hard work lead to success."

The School over the years has produced excellent students which have been a success in the global community some of which have reached great heights in foreign universities and even local. 

High schools in Zimbabwe
Buildings and structures in Bulawayo
Catholic secondary schools in Zimbabwe
Educational institutions established in 1965
Education in Bulawayo
1965 establishments in Rhodesia